Anna Ilczuk (born 21 August 1981 in Wrocław, Poland) is a Polish film, television and theater actress, best known for playing in the Polish TV series Pierwsza miłość (First Love).

Selected filmography 
 2004: O czym są moje oczy as Anna
 2004–present: Pierwsza miłość (First Love) as Emilia Śmiałek
 2005: Droga Molly (Molly's Way) as Wioletta
 2005–2006: Warto kochać as Andżela 
 2009: Rajskie klimaty as Andżela
 2011: 80 milionów as Mrs. Ola
 2011: Daas as Joanna
 2011: Sala samobójców as Ada
 2011–present: Świat według Kiepskich (The World According to the Kiepskis) as Jolanta Pupcia-Kiepska
 2011: Z miłości as Joanna

Awards 
 2011: Odznaka honorowa „Zasłużony dla Kultury Polskiej” (Badge of Honor "Merit for Polish Culture)

References

External links 

Official profile in Filmpolski.pl database

1981 births
Polish film actresses
Polish television actresses
Actors from Wrocław
Polish stage actresses
20th-century Polish actresses
Living people